North Elizabeth Street is a neighborhood in southwestern Lexington, Kentucky, United States. It is located just west of the University of Kentucky and most of its residents are college students.

Neighborhood statistics
 Area: 
 Population: 1,180
 Population density: 7,191 people per square mile
 Median household income: $18,138

External links
 http://www.city-data.com/neighborhood/North-Elizabeth-St-Lexington-KY.html

Neighborhoods in Lexington, Kentucky